The Rose Has Teeth in the Mouth of a Beast is the sixth studio album by Matmos. Each of the album's songs is dedicated to a notable gay or lesbian person who has influenced the duo, and this influence is reflected in the songs themselves. For examples, "Rag for William S. Burroughs" features the clatter of a type writer and a gunshot, representing the William Tell incident, and "Tract for Valerie Solanas" contains excerpts from the SCUM Manifesto.

As with earlier releases, the duo make use of field recordings in the music, recordings that range from ordinary things to more absurd sounds, such as a recording of a bovine uterus. The album's title is taken from a line in Ludwig Wittgenstein’s Philosophical Investigations.

Critical reception
The Rose Has Teeth in the Mouth of a Beast received positive reviews from music critics. Review aggregator website Metacritic gives it a score of 81 out of 100 based on 22 critics, indicating "universal acclaim." Brandon Stosuy, writing for Pitchfork, wrote in a positive review that "there are a few moments when the concept's cooler than the result, but in general The Rose Has Teeth'''s experiments result in frenetic dance tracks doubling as reading lists."

Jonathan Keefe, writing for Slant Magazine, called the album "endlessly fascinating" but concluded that "even armed with a cheat sheet from Wikipedia and a desire to figure out the significance of every last hair clipper and gunshot, the album never engages as anything more than an academic exercise."Pitchfork'' placed it at number 47 on the "Top 50 Albums of 2006" list.

Track listing

Charts

References

External links
 

2006 albums
Cultural depictions of Valerie Solanas
Matmos albums
Matador Records albums
Musique concrète albums
LGBT-related albums